Ana & Jorge: Ao Vivo is an MPB album by Brazilian singers Ana Carolina and Seu Jorge, released on CD and DVD in 2005.  In Brazil it was awarded Triple Platinum certification, as more than 300,000 copies were sold in the country.

Background 
Recorded at the "Tom Acoustic," now known as HSBC Brasil, in Sao Paulo, the show featured acoustic versions of hit songs from both singers' careers thus far, such as "São Gonça", "Carolina" and "Chatterton" (by Jorge); and "Pra Rua Me Levar", "Garganta" and "Vestido Estampado" (by Ana Carolina).

The show also featured new songs such as "Nega Marrenta", "Notícias Populares"  (later rerecorded by Ana as a double album "Dois Quartos", which in this show are just on the DVD), "Brasil Corrupção" (Ana Carolina's duet with Tom Zé) and "É Isso Aí" the Portuguese version of The Blower's Daughter, by the Irish musician Damien Rice, who was considered the most successful song on the album, being released as the first single.

Track List

CD

DVD 
 São Gonça
 Tive Razão
 Zé do Caroço
 Brasis
 Carolina
 Comparsas / O Pequinês e o Pitbull
 Tanta Saudade
 É Isso Aí (The Blower's Daughter)
 Pra Rua Me Levar
 Chatterton
 Nega Marrenta
 Notícias Populares
 Texto: Só de Sacanagem
 Brasil Corrupção (Unimultiplicidade)
 Beatriz
 Mais Que Isso
 Garganta
 Vestido Estampado
 O Beat da Beata
 Convites Para A Vida (recorded in a samba)

Extras 
 Mais Samba (excerpts written in samba style):
 Se o Caminho é Meu / Sonho Meu / Alguém Me Avisou
 Tendências
 Quatro Toras de Queijo
 Making-of
 Text: "Alfredo, é Gisele"

Personnel 

Bruno Batista – art direction
Ana Carolina – violin, vocals, pandeiro, producer, direction, Bass
Daniela Conolly – graphic design, art direction
Pretinho DaSerrinha – cavaquinho
Vitor Farias – engineer
Carlinhos Freitas – mastering
Marilene Gondim – producer, executive producer
Seu Jorge – clarinet, violin, vocals, pandeiro, direction, bass
Bernardo Pacheco – sound technician
Sérgio Ricardo – mixing
Marcelo Sussekind – mixing

Certifications

References

Ana Carolina albums
Seu Jorge albums
2003 live albums
2003 video albums
Live video albums